Petar Pavlović may refer to:

 Petar Pavlović (footballer, born 1987), Serbian football player
 Petar Pavlović (footballer, born 1997), Austrian football player
 Petar Pavlović (geologist) (1864–1938), Serbian geologist